
Gmina Raszków is an urban-rural gmina (administrative district) in Ostrów Wielkopolski County, Greater Poland Voivodeship, in west-central Poland.

Villages
Apart from the town of Raszków, Gmina Raszków contains the villages and settlements of Bieganin, Bugaj, Drogosław, Głogowa, Grudzielec, Grudzielec Nowy, Janków Zaleśny, Jaskółki, Jelitów, Józefów, Koryta, Korytnica, Ligota, Moszczanka, Niemojewiec, Pogrzybów, Przybysławice, Rąbczyn, Radłów, Skrzebowa, Sulisław, Szczurawice and Walentynów.

Neighbouring gminas
Gmina Raszków is bordered by the town of Ostrów Wielkopolski and by the gminas of Dobrzyca, Krotoszyn, Ostrów Wielkopolski and Pleszew.

References
Polish official population figures 2006

Raszkow
Ostrów Wielkopolski County